Dawala Pawura is a 2011 Sri Lankan Sinhala adult drama film directed by Luxman Arachchige and co-produced by Luxman Arachchige himself with Sunil Saliya Ranaweera for Laksara Films. It stars Luxman Arachchige and Chamila Nishanthi in lead roles along with Hyasinth Wijeratne and Sandun Wijesiri. Music composed by Asokaa Peiris. It is the 1151st Sri Lankan film in the Sinhala cinema.

Cast
 Chamila Nishanthi as Maduwanthi
 Luxman Arachchige as Udara
 Sunil Saliya Ranaweera
 Clarice De Silva as Silvia
 Sandun Wijesiri as Dunuwila
 Hyasinth Wijeratne as Sandalatha
 Shelton Payagala as Professor
 Thilakarathna Liyanage as Wilfred
 Sunil Liyanarachchi as Sirisoma
 Achala Lakmali as Kaushalya
 Sunil Saliya Ranaweera as Malan
 Rohitha Mannage as Rathnayake
 Palitha Nanayakkara as Wickie
 Vije Hettiarachchi as Rangalla
 Kumara Ranepura as Kumara

References

External links
 

2011 films
2010s Sinhala-language films
2011 drama films
Sri Lankan drama films